Lophiotoma hejingorum is a species of sea snail, a marine gastropod mollusc in the family Turridae.

Description
The length of the shell varies between 22 mm and 32.8 mm.

Distribution
This marine species occurs off Nocnocan Island, Bohol, the Philippines.

References

 Stahlschmidt P., Poppe G.T. & Tagaro S.P. (2018). Descriptions of remarkable new turrid species from the Philippines. Visaya. 5(1): 5-64. page(s): 34, pl. 27 figs 1-3.

External links
 Worms Link

hejingorum
Gastropods described in 2018